Leonard Gerald Gwynne Ramsey (17 March 1913 – 14 May 1990) was a British antiquarian, writer, encyclopaedist and editor from 1951 of The Connoisseur magazine.

References

Leonard G. G. Ramsey's Rootsweb profile

English magazine editors
1913 births
1990 deaths
Oxfordshire and Buckinghamshire Light Infantry officers
British Army personnel of World War II
People educated at Radley College
English antiquarians